Henry Edgar Roethe (May 1866 – August 16, 1939) was an American politician and newspaper editor who was a Republican candidate for governor of Wisconsin in 1914.

Early life and education
Born in Whitewater, Wisconsin, Roethe attended Whitewater Normal State School.

Career 
Roethe moved to Fennimore, Wisconsin, where he bought and published a newspaper. Roethe served in the Wisconsin State Assembly from 1907 to 1910 and 1913 to 1914. From 1917 to 1924, he was a member of the Wisconsin Senate for the 16th district.

Personal life 
Roethe committed suicide on August 16, 1939; his body was found in Lake Monona. Roethe was succeeded by his younger brother, Edward J. Roethe, in the Wisconsin Senate.

References

1866 births
1939 deaths
People from Fennimore, Wisconsin
People from Whitewater, Wisconsin
Republican Party members of the Wisconsin State Assembly
Republican Party Wisconsin state senators
Editors of Wisconsin newspapers
University of Wisconsinandamp;ndash;Whitewater alumni
1939 suicides
Suicides by drowning in the United States
Suicides in Wisconsin